The Territorial Efficiency Medal (TEM) was a United Kingdom award for long service in the Territorial Army. It superseded the Territorial Force Efficiency Medal when the Territorial Force became the Territorial Army in 1921. It was superseded by the Efficiency Medal in 1930.

Award criteria
The medal was awarded to non-commissioned officers and men for a minimum of 12 years service in the Territorial Army, providing they attended 12 annual training camps. Previous service in other part-time forces including the Territorial Force could count, while war service counted double. Clasps for further periods of 12 years service were intended but never issued, since the medal was superseded by the Efficiency Medal after 9 years.

The equivalent award for commissioned officers was the Territorial Decoration. A recipient could wear both awards together, provided they completed the full periods of qualifying service for each.

Description
The reverse has a raised rim and bears the inscription "TERRITORIAL EFFICIENCY MEDAL" on three lines.The recipient's service number, rank, name, and unit were impressed on the edge of the medal.

The medal hangs from a ring suspension, attached to the medal by a claw fixing.

Honourable Artillery Company
For members of the Honourable Artillery Company (HAC) the ribbon differed, being half blue, half scarlet with yellow edges, reflecting the racing colours of King Edward VII. This distinction was bestowed by Edward VII for the Volunteer Long Service And Good Conduct Medal and the honour was extended to long service medals under the Territorial designations.

References

Further reading
J M A Tamplin, The Territorial Force Efficiency Medal, 1908–1921 and the Territorial Efficiency Medal, 1922–1930, (1985), (Spink: London)

External links
Search cards recording the award of the TEM on The UK National Archives' website.
Territorial Efficiency Medal, Medal Encyclopaedia. Online Medals.

Decorations of the British Army
Military awards and decorations of the United Kingdom
Long and Meritorious Service Medals of Britain and the Commonwealth